Mnestheus is a character from Roman mythology, found in Virgil's Aeneid. He is described by Virgil as the ancestral hero of the Memmii and "Of the house of Assaracus". One of a handful of vaguely defined lieutenants under Aeneas, he appears to be Aeneas's most senior captain, taking charge in Book 9 in his absence. He takes second place in the boat race during the funeral games of Anchises in Book 5.

See also 
 9023 Mnesthus, Jovian asteroid named after Mnestheus
 Mnestheus (skipper), a genus of butterflies

References 
 Virgil IV, 288; IX, 171, 781.
 A Dictionary of Greek and Roman Antiquities edited by William Smith (1870).

External links 
  

Characters in the Aeneid
Characters in Roman mythology